Polylepta is a genus of flies belonging to the family Mycetophilidae.

The species of this genus are found in Europe, Russia and Northern America.

Species:
 Polylepta borealis Lundstrom, 1912 
 Polylepta dubiosa Brunetti, 1912

References

Mycetophilidae